Mustafa Hilmi  ef. Hadžiomerović (born 1816 in Kulen Vakuf, near Bihać; died 10 February 1895) was the first Mufti of Sarajevo appointed reis-ul-ulema in 1882 by the Austrian authorities.

Career
Hadžiomerović received his basic religious and general education in his birth town. He later studied at the high school in Prijedor and then went to the Gazi Husrev-beg Medresa in Sarajevo. There he studied before the famous schoolmaster Mehmed efendija Kučuk and attended lectures in Sarajevo of Mufti Muhamed Šakir efendije Muidović and Muhamed Telalagić.

In 1837 Hadžiomerović went to Istanbul to study at a Madrasah there for 15 years. He then returned to Bosnia to work in Bosanski Novi and was then posted to the Kuršumli madrasah in Sarajevo as a schoolteacher. A year later he was appointed Imam at the Arebi-Atik mosque. 

In 1856 Mustafa  Hilmi Hadžiomerović was appointed Mufti of Sarajevo but he continued his teaching duties, giving lectures until 1888. Following the Habsburg occupation of Bosnia in 1878, Hadžiomerović made public appeals for peace and calm. On 17 October 1882 the Austrias appointed him Reis-l-ulema in order to gradually separate Bosnia from Turkish authority. He issued a number of Fatwa encouraging Bosnian Muslims to stay (over 100,000 emigrated to Turkey over the 1880s) and collaborate, and also to serve in the Bosnian Herzegovinian Infantry. 

Exhausted from many years of work, Mustafa Hilmi Hadžiomerović resigned the position of reis-ul-ulema in 1893 and died two years later on 10 February 1895.

References

Literature
 Noel Malcolm, Bosnia: A Short History, 1994 
 Fikret Karčić, The Bosniaks and the Challenges of Modernity: Late Ottoman and Hapsburg Times (1995)

|-

1816 births
1895 deaths
Bosniaks of Bosnia and Herzegovina
Bosnia and Herzegovina Muslims
Grand Muftis of Bosnia and Herzegovina